SM City Fairview is a large shopping mall in the Philippines owned and operated by SM Prime Holdings. It is located along Quirino Highway and Regalado Highway, Quezon City, Metro Manila. It is the third SM Supermall in Quezon City, after SM City North EDSA and SM City Sta. Mesa. Although it is named after the nearby Fairview area or barangay, it is located in Barangay Greater Lagro.

History
SM City Fairview is a part of the SM mall triplets designed by Palafox and Associates, a concept that was employed by SM at the height of the 1997 Asian financial crisis, of building three shopping malls in different areas under one design template. Thus, the mall's exterior facade and interior has similarities to SM City Bacoor and SM City Iloilo. The mall opened on October 25, 1997, and underwent expansions in three annexes in 2004, 2009, and 2019. The mall initially consists of a rectangular-shaped building and an outdoor parking. Subsequent annex constructions and renovations were designed by Point Design and JRP Design Inc.

Mall complex
SM City Fairview is a four-building, four-level complex with a gross floor area of  located on a  site in Quezon City, Metro Manila. The mall has 4 major tenant zones: SM Foodcourt on the ground level of the main building, Cyberzone at the third Level of the main building and the Health and Wellness Zones.

Main building
The main building measured . It features mall tenants such as The SM Store and SM Supermarket, 8 cinemas, a 20-lane bowling center, food court, Cyberzone, amusement areas, and international stores such as H&M, Uniqlo, Forever 21, etc.  The second Health and Wellness Zone is located at the second level of the main building and was launched on July 16, 2010, after the opening of the Cyberzone. The mall formerly had an amusement center (SM Storyland) located on the third floor before it was close down in 2014 and was renovated for the expansion of Cyberzone.

SM Cinema renovation
The main building formerly had 12 cinemas, renovated in 2010 and half of the cinema area was closed in 2018 and reopened on November 22, 2019. The former Cinemas 7-12 is now home to a Large Format Theater (Megascreen, under new Cinema 1), 5 digital cinemas (under new Cinemas 2–6), and 2 Director's Club cinemas with Dolby Atmos sound system (under new Cinemas 7–8). 4 out of 6 cinemas in the other wing were closed for the continuation of the renovations, with the other two remain in temporary operations (Cinemas 9-10, which was formerly Cinemas 1 and 6) and they were closed on January 8, 2020, after the celebration of the 2019 Metro Manila Film Festival. The former cinema wing will be renovated and planned as a retail space for MRT-7 connection. SM Bowling will be one of the new tenants in this wing, relocating from the lower ground floor.

Annex 1
The Annex 1 of the mall is a two-story building that opened on May 24, 2004. This  building has two levels of retail shops and restaurants.

It also features a  SM Hypermarket located on the lower ground level, the Palm Strip, and more shops and services. The Event Center and Ace Builders Center were once located in Annex 1 before they were relocated to Annex 2.

Annex 2

Annex 2 of the mall opened on January 15, 2009. The current Annex 2 Mall measured . It is a three-story building with a large, semicircle atrium that hosted events, mall concerts, and product launches. Ace Builders Center and the first Health and Wellness Zone are located on the lower ground level of the Annex 2.

Parkway (Annex 3)
The Parkway (Annex 3) has a long hallway to connect three buildings at the back. The new expansion building has a house of few hundreds of tenants, a 2-floor parking building, five BPO towers (as of 2021, there are 3 towers currently built) and a rooftop garden. The SM Supermarket and SM Hypermarket has built their new entrance and exit to access The Parkway. It has been relaunched the same day when The Parkway opened. 

The Fairview campus of the National University is located in one of the Fairview Towers, the mall's BPO towers. The first BPO Tower (Belfast Side) has been occupied by a private company and is operating since 2019. The remaining two BPO towers will be completed between 2021 and 2022. The Parkway officially opened its doors on April 27, 2019, with many activities and guests.

Incidents
 December 24, 2019: A minor fire broke out at a Mang Inasal branch in the main building of the mall. The fire started at the kitchen of the said famous fastfood chain branch. After the fire, the mall temporarily closed and eventually opened later that afternoon. Some stalls were closed but some major tenants of the mall reopened again. The mall officials made an investigation regarding to the incident. The ill-fated branch has been closed for business.

In popular culture

 In the 2003 film Captain Barbell, the mall appeared in the explosion scene without having its logo being edited out.

See also
 SM City San Jose Del Monte
 SM City North EDSA
 Robinsons Novaliches
 Fairview Terraces

References

Shopping malls established in 1997
SM Prime
Shopping malls in Quezon City
Buildings and structures in Quezon City